Talalaivka Raion was a raion (district) of Chernihiv Oblast, northern Ukraine. Its administrative centre was located at the urban-type settlement of Talalaivka. The raion was abolished on 18 July 2020 as part of the administrative reform of Ukraine, which reduced the number of raions of Chernihiv Oblast to five. The area of Talalaivka Raion was merged into Pryluky Raion. The last estimate of the raion population was 

At the time of disestablishment, the raion consisted of one hromada, Talalaivka settlement hromada with the administration in Talalaivka.

References

Former raions of Chernihiv Oblast
1933 establishments in Ukraine
Ukrainian raions abolished during the 2020 administrative reform